Zinc finger protein 26 is a protein that in humans is encoded by the ZNF26 gene.

References

Further reading 

Human proteins